Xabier Iriondo (Milan, 9 February 1971) is an Italian guitarist.

He was born in Isola neighborhood in Milan in 1971, Basque father and Italian mother. At the age of 17 he started to play the guitar. This passion for the strings still accompanies him. Between 1992 and 2001 he collaborated on five albums and hundreds of concerts with the alternative rock band Afterhours, 3 albums with the indie rock band Six Minute War Madness and 3 albums + 2 miniCD with the project A Short Apnea.
From 2005 to 2010 opens in Milan "Soundmetak", a shop / lab where he sells musical instruments and organizes special musical performances. Since 2010 he restarted to collaborate with the group Afterhours.

Solo album

Irrintzi is the only solo album by Xabier Iriondo, released in 2012 by Wallace Records – Phonometak – Long Song Records – Santeria – Brigadisco – Paintvox.

Track list
 Elektraren Aurreskua
 Irrintzi
 Il cielo sfondato
 Gernika Eta Bermeo
 Reason To Believe
 Preferirei piuttosto gente per bene gente per male
 The Hammer
 Itziar En Semea
 Cold Turkey

Discography

1993
Afterhours – Pop Kills Your Soul – CD – Vox Pop
Six Minute War Madness – faces vol.2 compilation – CD – Face Records
Six Minute War Madness – lubricant for your mind compilation – CD – Circus
1994
Six Minute War Madness – Arezzo wave compilation – CD – EMI
1995
Afterhours – Germi – CD – EMI
Six Minute War Madness – holy Joe / evensong – 7' – BluBus
1996
Six Minute War Madness –  s/t – CD – BluBus
Six Minute War Madness – l'ora giusta / la tempesta" – 7' – Man's Ruin Records
1997
Afterhours – Hai paura del buio? – CD – Mescal
Six Minute War Madness – il vuoto elettrico" – CD – Jungle Sound Records
ARKHAM NUBES (iriondo, cantù, magistrali, ciappini) "no title" – CD
1998
Afterhours – male di miele – singleCD – Mescal
Afterhours – sui giovani d'oggi... – singleCD – Mescal
1999
A SHORT APNEA – s / t – CD – Wallace Records
Afterhours – Non è per sempre – CD – Mescal
2000
Afterhours – bianca – singleCD – Mescal
Afterhours – la verità che ricordavo – singleCD – Mescal
Six Minute War Madness – full fathom six – CD – Santeria/Audioglobe
A SHORT APNEA – illu ogod ellat rhagedia – CD – Wallace Records
2001
Afterhours – Siam tre piccoli porcellin – 2CD – Mescal
2002
A SHORT APNEA – an indigo ballad – CD – Wallace Records
A SHORT APNEA – five greeney stages – CD – Wallace Records
2003
2partimollitremolanti – s / t – miniCD – Wallace Records
EAReNOW – ffrrr – miniCD – Wallace Records
Tasaday – Kaspar project – CD – Wallace Records
2004
A SHORT APNEA (with GORGE TRIO) – ...just arrived – CD – Wallace Records
POLVERE "s / t" – miniCD – Wallace Records
Tasaday – in attesa, nel labirinto – CD – Wallace Records
FOUR GARDENS IN ONE – s / t – miniCD – Wallace Records
UNCODE DUELLO – s / t – CD – Wallace Records
2005
BIAS – s / t – miniCD – Wallace Records
2006
END OF SUMMER – s / t – miniCD – Ame Records
OLEO STRUT – s / t – miniCD – Wallace Records
POLVERE – s / t – CD – Wallace Records
THE SHIPWRECK BAG SHOW – s / t – miniCD – Wallace Records
Zu/Xabier Iriondo – PhonoMetak series 1" – 10" – PhonoMetak labs / Wallace Records
2007
UNCODE DUELLO – EX ÆQUO – CD – Wallace Records
Polvere – s/t – 10" – Wallace Records/TwonTone/Minorità Records
OvO/Sinistri with Xabier Iriondo – PhonoMetak series 3" – vinyl 10' – PhonoMetak labs/Wallace Records
Kursk (soundtrack) "The Truth at the End"  – DVD/CD – Amirani Records
2008
Damo Suzuki with Metak Network / ZU with X.Iriondo "PhonoMetak series 4" – vinyl 10' – PhonoMetak labs / Wallace Records
X.IRIONDO/G.MIMMO – "Your Very Eyes" – PhonoMetak labs / Amirani Records / Wallace Records / LongSong Records
2009
The Shipwreck bag Show "Il tempo ........... tra le nostre mani, scoppia" – CD – PhonoMetak labs / Wallace Records / LongSong Records
Gianni Gebbia / Stefano Giust / Xabier Iriondo – "L'edera, il colle e la nebbia" – CD – Setola di Maiale
EAReNOW "Eclipse" – CD – WallaceRecords / Amirani / ReR / PhonoMetak labs
UNCODE DUELLO "tre" – CD/10' – Wallace Records
2010
The Shipwreck bag Show "KC" – CD – PhonoMetak labs / Wallace Records / LongSong Records / PaintVox / Brigadisco
WINTERMUTE – "s/t" – CD – Die Schachtel
AN EXPERIMENT IN NAVIGATION "s/t" – CD – Die Schachtel
NO GURU "Milano Original Soundtrack" – CD – Bagana
2011
?Alos/Xabier Iriondo – ?Alos – Ep 7" – Tarzan Records / Bar La Muerte
Damo Suzuki's Network – "Sette modi per salvare Roma" – CD – Goodfellas
2012
OLEO STRUT – "Bunga Bunga" – Vinile 12" – Phonometak / Komanull
The Shipwreck bag Show – vinile 7" – PhonoMetak labs / Tarzan Records / PaintVox /
Afterhours – Padania – CD – Artist First
Mistaking Monks "Mantic" – CD – PhonoMetak labs
Xabier Iriondo – Irrintzi – double vinyl 12" – Wallace Records
?Alos/Xabier Iriondo – Endimione – Vinile 12" – Brigadisco

References

1971 births
Living people
Italian people of Spanish descent
Italian people of Basque descent
Italian rock guitarists
Italian male guitarists
Musicians from Milan
Italian guitarists
21st-century guitarists
21st-century Italian male musicians